Jean Oser (1908–2002) was a German-American film editor. He was born in the Alsatian capital of Straßburg (French: Strasbourg), which then was part of the German Empire but was subsequently transferred to France. He never had a French citizenship. He is sometimes credited as Hans Oser.

In the 1970s, he taught at the University of Regina Department of Film.

Selected filmography 
 Land Without Women (1929)
 The Call of the North (1929)
 The Night Belongs to Us (1929)
 Dreyfus (1930)
 End of the Rainbow (1930)
 The Threepenny Opera (1931)
 L'Atlantide (1932)
 The Lafarge Case (1938)
 Sarajevo (1940)

References

Bibliography 
 Susan M. White. The Cinema of Max Ophuls: Magisterial Vision and the Figure of Woman″. Columbia University Press, 1995.

External links 
 

1908 births
2002 deaths
German film editors
Mass media people from Strasbourg
American film editors
German emigrants to the United States